The 2005 Men's Hockey RaboTrophy was the third edition of the men's field hockey tournament. The RaboTrophy was held in Amsterdam from 14 to 21 August 2005, and featured eight of the top nations in men's field hockey.

Pakistan won the tournament for the first time, defeating Australia 4–3 in the final.

Competition format
The eight teams were split into pools of four, with each team participating in a single round robin format. At the conclusion of the pool stage, the top two teams of each pool contested the final, with the teams consecutively competing in classification matches based on pool standings.

Teams
The following eight teams competed for the title:

Results
All times are local (Central European Time).

Preliminary round

Pool A

Pool B

Classification round

Seventh and eighth place

Fifth and sixth place

Third and fourth place

Final

Awards
The following awards were presented at the conclusion of the tournament:

Statistics

Final standings

Goalscorers

References

External links
Official Website

RaboTrophy
Hockey RaboTrophy
Men's Hockey RaboTrophy
Hockey RaboTrophy
Sports competitions in Amstelveen